William Samuel Johnston (October 1, 1847 – November 24, 1931) was an American politician in the state of Washington. He served in the Washington House of Representatives from 1895 to 1897, alongside Moses Bull.

References

Republican Party members of the Washington House of Representatives
1847 births
1931 deaths